Yurenino is a rural locality (a village) in Tolshmenskoye Rural Settlement, Totemsky District, Vologda Oblast, Russia. The population was 12 as of 2002.

Geography 
Yurenino is located 94 km south of Totma (the district's administrative centre) by road. Pervomaysky is the nearest rural locality.

References 

Rural localities in Tarnogsky District